China Lake Acres is a census-designated place (CDP) in Kern County, California, United States. The population was 1,876 at the 2010 census, up from 1,761 at the 2000 census.

Geography 

Demographics

2010
At the 2010 census China Lake Acres had a population of 1,876. The racial makeup of China Lake Acres was 1,601 (85.3%) White, 35 (1.9%) African American, 29 (1.5%) Native American, 16 (0.9%) Asian, 7 (0.4%) Pacific Islander, 84 (4.5%) from other races, and 104 (5.5%) from two or more races. Hispanic or Latino of any race were 265 people (14.1%).

The whole population lived in households, no one lived in non-institutionalized group quarters and no one was institutionalized.

There were 755 households, 219 (29.0%) had children under the age of 18 living in them, 376 (49.8%) were opposite-sex married couples living together, 87 (11.5%) had a female householder with no husband present, 48 (6.4%) had a male householder with no wife present. There were 49 (6.5%) unmarried opposite-sex partnerships, and 1 (0.1%) same-sex married couples or partnerships. 204 households (27.0%) were one person and 78 (10.3%) had someone living alone who was 65 or older. The average household size was 2.48. There were 511 families (67.7% of households); the average family size was 2.95.

The age distribution was 433 people (23.1%) under the age of 18, 127 people (6.8%) aged 18 to 24, 410 people (21.9%) aged 25 to 44, 593 people (31.6%) aged 45 to 64, and 313 people (16.7%) who were 65 or older. The median age was 44.0 years. For every 100 females, there were 102.2 males. For every 100 females age 18 and over, there were 103.2 males.

There were 855 housing units at an average density of 164.1 per square mile, of the occupied units 561 (74.3%) were owner-occupied and 194 (25.7%) were rented. The homeowner vacancy rate was 1.6%; the rental vacancy rate was 6.2%. 1,337 people (71.3% of the population) lived in owner-occupied housing units and 539 people (28.7%) lived in rental housing units.

2000
At the 2000 census there were 1,761 people, 702 households, and 497 families living in the CDP. The racial makeup of the CDP was 89.49% White, 1.25% Black or African American, 0.80% Native American, 0.85% Asian, 0.23% Pacific Islander, 3.86% from other races, and 3.52% from two or more races. 9.37% of the population were Hispanic or Latino of any race.
Of the 702 households 27.9% had children under the age of 18 living with them, 55.8% were married couples living together, 11.1% had a female householder with no husband present, and 29.1% were non-families. 23.6% of households were one person and 10.7% were one person aged 65 or older. The average household size was 2.51 and the average family size was 2.95.

The age distribution was 25.4% under the age of 18, 5.8% from 18 to 24, 25.2% from 25 to 44, 26.9% from 45 to 64, and 16.6% 65 or older. The median age was 41 years. For every 100 females, there were 100.8 males. For every 100 females age 18 and over, there were 96.6 males.

The median household income was $35,375 and the median family income  was $39,408. Males had a median income of $39,643 versus $20,536 for females. The per capita income for the CDP was $17,146. About 10.5% of families and 17.2% of the population were below the poverty line, including 27.7% of those under age 18 and 6.0% of those age 65 or over.

References

Census-designated places in Kern County, California
Populated places in the Mojave Desert
Census-designated places in California